Jose Luis Tovar is a paralympic athlete from Spain competing mainly in category T11 track events.

Jose Luis has competed at three paralympics starting with the 800m and 1500m at the 1992 Summer Paralympics where he failed to make the final. In the 1996 Summer Paralympics won the silver medal in the 400m, and finished fourth in the 800m. At his final games in 2000 he finished fourth in the 400m and failed to finished in the 1500m.

References

External links
 

Paralympic athletes of Spain
Athletes (track and field) at the 1992 Summer Paralympics
Athletes (track and field) at the 1996 Summer Paralympics
Athletes (track and field) at the 2000 Summer Paralympics
Paralympic silver medalists for Spain
Living people
Medalists at the 1996 Summer Paralympics
Year of birth missing (living people)
Paralympic medalists in athletics (track and field)
Spanish male middle-distance runners
Visually impaired middle-distance runners
Paralympic middle-distance runners
20th-century Spanish people